John Worsley may refer to:

John Worsley (scholar) (1696–1767), English scholar and schoolmaster
Sir John Worsley (British Army officer) (1912–1987), British general
John Worsley (artist) (1919–2000), British artist and illustrator
Les Vandyke (John Worsley, 1931–2021), British singer-songwriter